Podlaski (femine: Podlaska) may refer to the following places:
Podlaski, Kuyavian-Pomeranian Voivodeship (north-central Poland)
Podlaski, Lublin Voivodeship (east Poland)
Podlaski, Podlaskie Voivodeship (north-east Poland)

Biała Podlaska
Bielsk Podlaski
Janów Podlaski
Komarówka Podlaska
Leśna Podlaska
Międzyrzec Podlaski
Radzyń Podlaski
Sokołów Podlaski

People 
Michał Podlaski (born 1988), Polish racing cyclist